This is a list of governors of the Department of Valle del Cauca from its creation by decree number 340 of April 16, 1910. The current Governor of Valle del Cauca is Clara Luz Roldán.

Governors

Notes

References 
 

Valle del Cauca